The 2021–22 Maryland Terrapins women's basketball team represented the University of Maryland, College Park during the 2021–22 NCAA Division I women's basketball season. The Terrapins were led by head coach Brenda Frese in her twentieth season, and played their home games at the Xfinity Center as a member of the Big Ten Conference.

Previous season
The Terrapins finished the 2020–21 season with a 26–3 record, including 17–1 in Big Ten play to finish in first place and capturing their sixth Big Ten title.  They also won the 2021 Big Ten women's basketball tournament title for the fifth time in school history, and received an automatic bid to the 2021 NCAA Division I women's basketball tournament, where they advanced to the Sweet Sixteen.

Offseason
On May 25, 2021, Maryland signed Brenda Frese to a six-year contract extension through the 2026–27 season.

Roster

Schedule and results

|-
!colspan=9 style=| Exhibition

|-
!colspan=9 style=| Regular Season

|-
!colspan=6 style=|

|-
!colspan=6 style=|

Rankings

*Coaches did not release a week 1 poll.

References

External links
 Official Team Website

Maryland Terrapins women's basketball seasons
Maryland
Maryland
Maryland
Maryland